Dalby–Jandowae Road is a continuous  road route in the Western Downs region of Queensland, Australia. The road is signed as State Route 82. Dalby–Jandowae Road (number 421) is a state-controlled regional road.

Route Description
The road enters  as High Street and ends at an intersection with George Street, which runs east to become Kingaroy–Jandowae Road. The physical road continues north as Jandowae Connection Road (High Street) (State Route 82).

Land use along this road is almost exclusively crop farming. The former railway line followed the road for most of its length.

Road condition
Dalby–Jandowae Road is fully sealed. The steepest incline on the road is only about 3%.

Jandowae Connection Road

Jandowae Connection Road is a state-controlled regional road (number 423). It is part of State Route 82.

State Route 82
It is not necessarily the best or the shortest or the quickest route between the two terminii. It was proclaimed as a State Route because, at the time, it was the most convenient route for many users. It is also an example of why motorists in unfamiliar territory should follow a designated route rather than rely on a vehicle navigation system, which may direct them onto less suitable alternative roads.

Here the Chinchilla–Wondai Road turns west, while State Route 82 continues south on Jandowae  Connection Road to Jandowae. In Jandowae the road name changes to Dalby–Jandowae Road, which continues to the Warrego Highway in the west of Dalby. From there it follows the Warrego Highway to the south-east until it reaches Dalby–Cecil Plains Road, where it continues south.

Note that many navigation systems will suggest a turn to the west in Cecil Plains, leading to Millmerran–Cecil Plains Road. This road continues south to Inglewood, where it meets the Cunningham Highway at a T-junction.

History

The Dalby area was settled in the 1840s, and a township was surveyed in 1853 and founded in 1854. A post office opened in 1855 and a school in 1861. The railway arrived in 1868, allowing the town to grow as the commercial centre for properties around it.

Canaga pastoral run was taken up in the early 1850s, and in 1853 was transferred to members of the Bell family, the owners of Jimbour Station. Jinghi Jinghi pastoral run, which existed in 1849, is believed to have been part of Jimbour.

From its inception in 1842, Jimbour grew to be a massive collection of pastoral runs through purchase of nearby leases. In 1877,  of land was resumed to establish smaller farms. The location of these is unknown, but some may have been in localities near Jandowae. Farms and villages were eventually established, with Canaga opening a school in 1911 and Jinghi in 1915.

Jandowae was settled in the 1860s and opened its first school in 1877. A reliable road connection to Dalby was needed to provide access to markets and larger items of equipment. The road was the only viable link until 1914, when the railway arrived.

Major intersections
All distances are from Google Maps. The entire road is in the Western Downs  local government area.

See also

 List of road routes in Queensland
 List of numbered roads in Queensland

Notes

References

Roads in Queensland